Wallis may refer to:

 Wallis Bird (born 1982), Irish singer
 Wallis Currie-Wood (born 1991), American actress
 Wallis Day (born 1994), English actress
 Wallis Giunta (born 1985), Canadian mezzo-soprano opera singer
 Wallis Mathias (1935–1994), Pakistani athlete
 Wallis Simpson (1896–1986), Duchess of Windsor

See also 
 Wallace (given name)
 Wallis (surname)
 Wallis (disambiguation)

English unisex given names
English-language unisex given names